Vaduthala Junction is a very old place in Arookutty in Alappuzha district in the state of Kerala, India, 50 km from the Kochi International Airport.

Facilities
There were many Shopping complexes including Hotel Adayadance, Vaduthala Jama-ath Higher Secondary School, Vaduthala Central Juma Masjid, SBI Arookutty, Nadvathul Islam society which is located less than 1 km from the Vaduthala Junction.

About the Nadvathul Islam society 
"Nadvathul Islam" (Regd) Vaduthala has been Registered under the Travancore – Cochin Literary, Scientific and Charitable societies Registration Act, XII of 1955 vide registration No. 11 / 1963, dated 28.05.1963. though the society has received registration on 1963 but it was started in 1938 itself with a small Mosque.  The place has the Nadvathul Islam orphanage, the Nadvathul Islam U.P SCHOOL, the Nadvathul Islam English school and the Nadvathul Islam Madrasa.

External links 
 http://www.nadvathulislam.com

Places in Alappuzha district